Eve is a 1968 thriller film directed by Jeremy Summers and starring Robert Walker, Fred Clark, Herbert Lom, Christopher Lee and introducing Celeste Yarnall as Eve. When the director quit midway through filming, Spanish horror film director Jesus Franco was brought in to finish the job. The film was a co-production between Britain, Spain, Liechtenstein and the United States, and location scenes were filmed in Brazil. It was also released as Eva en la Selva, The Face of Eve (in the UK), Eve in the Jungle, or Diana, Daughter of the Wilderness.

Plot
An explorer looking for a priceless missing Inca treasure in the Amazon jungle runs across a bikini clad and barefoot young woman named Eve, who is worshipped as a goddess by jungle natives. Eve is also being pursued by a showman who wants her for his freak show; by the natives who now want to kill her for helping a white man; and by an explorer, Eve's grandfather, who wants to silence her.

Cast
Robert Walker as Mike Yates
Fred Clark as John Burke
Herbert Lom as Diego
Christopher Lee as Colonel Stuart
Celeste Yarnall as Eve
Rosenda Monteros as Conchita
Maria Rohm as Anna
Jose Ma Caffarel as José
Ricardo Diaz as Bruno

Song credits
Lyric by Hal ShaperSung by Jago Simms

End credits
Filmed on locationin Spain and BrazilCopyright 1968 Udastex Films Limited

Critical reception
TV Guide called it a "very poorly done story of a Tarzaness" ; while Dave Sindelar wrote in Fantastic Movie Musings and Ramblings, "it's a dull affair, especially during the long middle section where the hero returns to civilization, and any interest it does generate is more due to the presence of several familiar faces (Herbert Lom, Christopher Lee, Fred Clark) than anything that actually happens. One fun thing to do in the movie is to keep track of how many characters die as a result of their own monumental stupidity; I count at least three."

See also
List of American films of 1968

References

External links
 

1968 films
British thriller films
American thriller films
Spanish thriller films
1960s thriller films
1960s English-language films
English-language Spanish films
Films directed by Jeremy Summers
Films scored by Malcolm Lockyer
Films set in Brazil
Jungle girls
1960s American films
1960s British films